Shores is a band from Grand Rapids, Michigan, and Minneapolis, Minnesota. The band is often described as "slowcore". Shores began as a recording project between guitarist, vocalist and bass guitarist Brian Przybylski, and drummer John Massel in summer 2008. After the completion of their second LP, To Volstead, guitarist Sean Stearns and bass guitarist Billy Bartholomew were added to the band. Massel and Shores parted ways at the start of 2013.

Shores are most known for their frequent recording output, having released their first full-length LP, Coup de Grace at The Fest in October 2010, followed by three more records at The Fest 10 in October 2011. A split 7-inch single with their label and tour mates Creepoid was released on record store day in 2012, followed by a third full-length LP, Leavening, the following summer, when, according to the band's official web site, a third guitarist, Patrick Boylan, also joined the band.

Albums
 Coup de Grace (No Idea Records - October 31, 2010)
 To Volstead (No Idea Records - October 28, 2011)
 Leavening (No Idea Records - August 7, 2012)
 Precedents (self-released - February 14, 2015)
 Shores (self-released - October 1, 2016)

EPs and split records
 "Little One"/"Something In The Way" 7-inch (No Idea Records - October 28, 2011)
 "Ritual" 12-inch collaboration/split EP with Charles the Osprey (No Idea Records - October 28, 2011)
 "Shores/Creepoid Split" 7-inch (No Idea Records - April 20, 2012)
 "The Merry Whatnot" single (self-released, December 20, 2014)
 "Neitherwise" EP (self-released, January 11, 2016)
 "Shores" EP (self-released, July 15, 2016)

References

External links 
Shores official web page

Musical groups from Michigan